Highway 698 is a highway in the Canadian province of Saskatchewan. It runs from Highway 55 to Highway 799.

Highway 698 is the only access road to the community of Matchee.

See also 
Roads in Saskatchewan
Transportation in Saskatchewan

References 

698